Desert beardtongue or desert penstemon is a common name for several plants and may refer to:

Penstemon parryi, native to the Sonoran desert of Arizona and northern Mexico
Penstemon pseudospectabilis, native to the southwestern United States